The Dark Tapes is a 2016 American found footage anthology horror film written and directed by Michael McQuown with Vincent J. Guastini directing the segment titled To Catch a Demon. The feature film consists of four segments To Catch A Demon, The Hunters & The Hunted, Cam Girls and Amanda's Revenge with a short opening sequence titled Wrap Around.

Plot
The film is presented as an anthology of short horror films, built into a frame narrative which acts as its own short horror film. Each short film is linked together with the concept of found footage.

Wrap Around
Sam and Marie find blood and a mess in their small theatrical playhouse, and blame their friend.

To Catch a Demon
Directed by Vincent J. Guastini
Dr. Martin Callahan and his graduate student Nicole believe that night terrors are a result of the time dilation humans experience during REM sleep, which allows "transdimensional entities", or what some people call demons,  to become visible. They attempt to perform an experiment to catch these entities with their hired cameraman Jason filming using a special high-speed camera. Their first attempt catches fleeting images of an entity.

During their second attempt, the same entity attacks Martin and sticks tentacles down his throat, using him to communicate to Nicole and Jason. Nicole and Jason lose consciousness as they attempt to flee. After regaining consciousness, they see Martin unharmed. Martin informs them they are trapped in a different time dilation due to the experiment, and that the area may have different flows of time, keeping them trapped there in a time dilation where the outside world seems frozen and they are invisible to others, just like the entities usually are. Martin thinks he can reverse the time dilation. Just as he is about to do so, Jason attempts to grab his high-speed camera and things go from bad to worse.

The Hunters & the Hunted
David and Karen move into a new home and almost immediately begin to hear mysterious sounds coming from the roof and from around the house. They decide to record the events, which include seemingly unexplainable phenomena such as objects moving on their own. After David is attacked by an unseen force, leaving a visible handprint on his back, they call in paranormal investigators. The investigators, consisting of a lead investigator, director, and cameraman, arrive and sets up equipment and recording devices to collect information. They leave the house and let the cameras run overnight. As they get ready for bed, Karen, and then David, are attacked by an unseen force. The investigators review the recordings from the previous night and see a haunting image of a menacing girl.

Cam Girls
Caitlin, a cam girl in a lesbian relationship, video chats with her friend telling him about unexplained blackouts after going out with her girlfriend Sindy. Caitlin says she did things she could not explain; things she would never do sober. Her friend advises her to drink less and everything should be fine. Sindy returns home and the two prepare for a special cam session where one member from a group chat will receive a free private show. Sindy asks Caitlin if she can convince her selection to cut himself, just a little bit. Sindy selects Gerry, a mild mannered overweight man. Sindy walks off screen and Caitlin begins flirting with Gerry. She asks him to give her a video tour of his house. As he gives Caitlin the tour a dark figure can be seen lurking in the background. Caitlin requests that Gerry cut his hand, which he does. Things intensify as flashes of evil are seen.

Amanda's Revenge
Amanda talks directly to the camera about being abducted and kidnapped for four months and states her intention of exacting revenge on her captors. Four month earlier, during a party, Amanda's friend Josh tells Ryan, Amanda's childhood best friend, that he saw two men carry an unconscious Amanda into a room. Ryan and Josh break into the room, subdue the molesters, and due to quick action appear to have prevented a rape from occurring. However, the next morning Amanda walks out in a trance suggesting she was violated in unimaginable ways. Suddenly the entire house quakes and Amanda sleepwalks back to her room, only to awaken with no memory of the incident. Even stranger, Ryan and Josh realize that there was no reported earthquake and everything seems fine outside.

A month later Amanda calls her friends over to watch her sleep at night. Something is wrong with Amanda and she's getting worse. However, instead of staying awake, everyone mysteriously passes out and the camera shuts down. Amanda confides in Ryan, who is her childhood best friend, that something unexplainable has been happening in her life.

Cast
 David Roy Banks as Sam
 Sara Castro as Marie
 David Rountree as Martin Callahan
 Cortney Palm as Nicole
 Matt Magnusson as Jason
 Shawn Lockie as Karen
 Stephen Zimpel as David
 Jo Galloway as Susan
 Clint Keepin as Cameron
 Jonthan Biver as Geoff
 Brittany Fisheli as Ashen
 Emilia Zoryan as Caitlin
 Anna Rose Moore as Sindy
 Aral Gibble as Gerry
 Brittany Underwood as Amanda Courtney
 Jake O'Connor as Ryan
 David Hull as Josh

Release 
The film premiered on April 22, 2016 at The Phoenix Film Festival and was released March 17, 2017 in the United States. It played in multiple festivals from 2016 to February 2017, and was picked up for US Distribution by Epic Pictures Group. The film was released theatrically on April 17, 2017 in select theaters, and is available internationally on all VOD platforms as of April 18, 2017. As of April 2020, it is also available for free on Amazon Prime in the United States and United Kingdom, as well as Tubi, Vudu, Crackle, Xumo, Fandango Now and Hoopla.

Reception

The Dark Tapes received mostly positive reviews. It currently holds an 90% on Rotten Tomatoes based on 10 reviews. Bradley Gibson of Film Threat gave the film an 8/10 saying "this is effective, mysterious, and vibey millennial horror". Ryan Morris of Film Inquiry said the film was "fun, scary and consistently tense". Steve Barton of Dread Central gave the film a positive review saying "ends up doing more right than it does wrong".

References

External links
 
 

2016 films
2016 horror films
2016 independent films
American supernatural horror films
American ghost films
American haunted house films
American horror anthology films
American independent films
Found footage films
Demons in film
2010s English-language films
2010s American films